Diastylidae is one of the eight most commonly recognised families of crustaceans of the order Cumacea. They are marine creatures especially common around the 30th parallel north.

Anatomy

Diastylidae have a medium to large, free telson, that has not fused with the last pleon segment. The telson usually bears two terminal setae.

Males have generally two pairs of pleopods, though in rare cases they may be rather small or even entirely absent. The flagellum of the second antenna reaches past the pereon.

In females the second antenna is much smaller than the first antenna. In males the third maxilliped and the first four pereiopods almost always have exopods (outer branches). In females they may, in rare cases, be absent from all but the third maxillipeds, and the two first pereiopods.

The interior branch of the uropods are generally made up of two or three segments, but in some rare case may have just one. Members of this family frequently show clear sexual dimorphism.

Genera
There are around 285 species, in 24 genera:

Anchicolurus Stebbing, 1912
Anchistylis Hole, 1945
Atlantistylis Reyss, 1975
Brachydiastylis Stebbing, 1912
Colurostylis Calman, 1911
Cuma Milne-Edwards, 1828
Diastylis Say, 1818
Diastyloides G. O. Sars, 1900
Diastylopsis Smith, 1880
Dic Stebbing, 1910
Dimorphostylis Zimmer, 1921
Divacuma
Ekleptostylis Stebbing, 1912
Ektonodiastylis Gerken, Watling & Klitgaard, 2000
Geyserius
Holostylis Stebbing, 1912
Leptostylis G. O. Sars, 1869
Leptostyloides
Makrokylindrus Stebbing, 1912
Oxyurostylis Calman, 1912
Pachystylis Hansen, 1895
Paradiastylis Calman, 1904
Paraleptostylis Vassilenko, 1990
Vemakylindrus Bacescu, 1961

References

External links

Cumacea
Crustacean families